The Chicago Shamrox were a lacrosse team based in Chicago playing in the National Lacrosse League (NLL). The 2008 season was the second and final in franchise history. The season ended up almost the same as the 2007 season, with the Shamrox 6-10 and out of the playoffs.

Regular season

Conference standings

Game log
Reference:

Player stats
Reference:

Runners (Top 10)

Note: GP = Games played; G = Goals; A = Assists; Pts = Points; LB = Loose balls; PIM = Penalty minutes

Goaltenders
Note: GP = Games played; MIN = Minutes; W = Wins; L = Losses; GA = Goals against; Sv% = Save percentage; GAA = Goals against average

Awards

Transactions

Trades

Roster
Reference:

See also
2008 NLL season

References

Chicago
2008 in sports in Illinois